Christopher Eubanks was the defending champion but lost in the final to Ben Shelton.

Shelton won the title after defeating Eubanks 6–3, 1–6, 7–6(7–4) in the final.

Seeds

Draw

Finals

Top half

Bottom half

References

External links
Main draw
Qualifying draw

Knoxville Challenger - 1
2022 Singles